
The micropound (abbreviation μlb) is a small unit of avoirdupois weight and mass in the US and imperial systems of measurement, equal to one-millionth pound. It is equal to exactly kg or about 453.6μg.

See also
 English, US, & imperial units of measurement
 Avoirdupois pound

References

Citations

Bibliography
 .

Units of mass